Acritonia is a monotypic snout moth genus in the subfamily Phycitinae. It was described by Hans Georg Amsel in 1954 It contains the species Acritonia comeella, which is known from Iran.

References

Phycitinae
Monotypic moth genera
Moths of the Middle East
Pyralidae genera
Taxa named by Hans Georg Amsel